Naypyidaw, officially spelled Nay Pyi Taw, is the capital and third-largest city of Myanmar. The city is located at the centre of the Naypyidaw Union Territory. It is unusual among Myanmar's cities, as it is an entirely planned city outside of any state or region. The city, then known only as Pyinmana District, officially replaced Yangon as the administrative capital of Myanmar on 6 November 2005; its official name was revealed to the public on Armed Forces Day, 27 March 2006.

As the seat of the government of Myanmar, Naypyidaw is the site of the Union Parliament, the Supreme Court, the Presidential Palace, the official residences of the Cabinet of Myanmar and the headquarters of government ministries and military. Naypyidaw is notable for its unusual combination of large size and very low population density. The city hosted the 24th and 25th ASEAN Summit, the 3rd BIMSTEC Summit, the Ninth East Asia Summit, the 2013 Southeast Asian Games and the 2014 AFC U-19 Championship.

Etymology
Naypyidaw is Burmese for "abode of the king", and is generally translated as "royal capital", "seat of the king", or "abode of kings". Traditionally, it was used as a suffix to the names of royal capitals, such as Mandalay, which was called Yattanarbon Naypyidaw.

History
Construction started in 2002 and was completed by 2012. At least 25 construction companies were hired by the military government to build the city. It is estimated that the planned city development reaches US$4 billion.

On 6 November 2006, more than 12,000 troops marched in the new capital in its first public event: a massive military parade to mark Armed Forces Day, the anniversary of Burma's 1945 revolution against the Japanese occupation. Filming was restricted to the concrete parade ground, which contains enormous sculptures of Kings Anawrahta, Bayinnaung and Alaungpaya. The city was officially named Naypyidaw during these ceremonies, and the official, albeit mostly administrative, capital of the country was relocated from Yangon to Naypyidaw.

Rationale behind moving the capital 
There are several assumptions why the capital was moved: Naypyidaw is more centrally located than the old capital, Yangon. It is also a transportation hub located adjacent to the Shan, Kayah, and Kayin states. It was felt by governmental and military leaders that a stronger military and governmental presence nearby might provide stability to those chronically turbulent regions. The official explanation for moving the capital was that Yangon had become too congested and crowded with little room for future expansion of government offices.

Geography and climate
Naypyidaw is located between the Bago Yoma and Shan Yoma mountain ranges.

Chaungmagyi Dam is located a few kilometres to the north of Naypyidaw, while Ngalaik Dam is a few kilometres to the south. The Yezin Dam is farther away in the north-east.

Cityscape
Naypyidaw is organized into a number of zones.

Residential zones

The residential areas are carefully organised, and apartments are allotted according to rank and marital status. The city has 1,200 four-story apartment blocks. The roofs of apartment buildings are color-coded by the jobs of their residents; Ministry of Health employees live in buildings with blue roofs and Ministry of Agriculture employees live in those with green roofs. High-ranking government officials live in mansions, of which there are about 50. However, in 2019, quite a few of the ministerial mansions were reported to be unused and left in a neglected state in overgrown compounds.

Ministry zone

The city's Ministry zone contains the headquarters of Myanmar's government ministries. All the ministry buildings are identical in appearance. A parliamentary complex consisting of 31 buildings and a 100-room presidential palace are also located there. The zone also contains the city hall building, which has many characteristics of Stalinist architecture, but with a Burmese-style roof.

Military zone
The city also hosts a military base, which is inaccessible to citizens or other personnel without written permission.

Diplomatic zone
The government has set aside  of land each for foreign embassies and headquarters of United Nations missions. The Chinese embassy formally opened its interim liaison office in 2017. The liaison office is the first foreign office to be permitted to open in Naypyidaw. Bangladesh and Malaysia have also signed agreements to open embassies in Naypyidaw. The government confirms that proposals have been put forward by 11 other countries to move their embassies to Naypyidaw, namely Russia, China, the United States, India, Saudi Arabia, Qatar, the Philippines, Indonesia, Thailand, Turkey and Kuwait. In February 2018, State Counsellor Daw Aung San Suu Kyi chaired a meeting at the Ministry of Foreign Affairs in Naypyidaw where she urged foreign governments to move their embassies to the capital.

Hotel zone
The Hotel zone has a handful of villa-style hotels on the hilly outskirts of the city. There are twelve hotels located in or near Naypyidaw. Eight of these are located within the Naypyidaw Hotel Zone, and two are located in Laeway (Lewe) on the Yangon-Mandalay Road.  Forty villas were constructed near the Myanmar Convention Centre in preparation for the 25th ASEAN summit conducted in Naypyidaw in November 2014.  Construction of the villas was begun in 2010 by the government. However, funds were limited, so the project was later put out to tender for completion by private sector investors. A total of 348 hotels and 442 inns were constructed to house the athletes and spectators of the 2013 Southeast Asian Games, which was hosted in Naypyidaw.

Shopping

Naypyidaw Myoma Market is the commercial centre of Naypyidaw. Other shopping areas include Thapye Chaung Market , Junction Centre Naypyidaw and Naypyidaw Wholesale. Junction Centre is the city's first privately operated shopping centre. There are also local markets and a restaurant area.

Recreation

Opened in 2008, facilities at the Ngalaik Lake Gardens include water slides, natural resorts, lodging and a beach. The gardens are open to the public during Thingyan holidays.

Also opened in 2008, the  National Herbal Park has exhibits of plants having medicinal applications from all of the major regions of Myanmar. There are thousands of plants at the park, representing hundreds of different species. Behind the city hall, there is a park with a playground and water fountain complex, which hosts a musical light show every night.

The Naypyidaw Zoological Gardens opened in 2008 with 420 species and now with 1500 animals. The main attraction of the zoo is the climate-controlled penguin house. The animals were shipped to it from the old one in Yangon. The Naypyidaw Safari Park officially opened on 12 February 2011.

Naypyidaw also has two golf courses, Naypyidaw City Golf Course and Yaypyar Golf Course, and a gem museum.

Landmark 
Similar in size and shape to the Shwedagon Pagoda in Yangon, Uppatasanti Pagoda was completed in 2009. This new pagoda is named the Uppatasanti or "Peace Pagoda". The stake-driving ceremony for the pagoda was held on 12 November 2006. The invitation card for the ceremony opened with a phrase "Rajahtani Naypyidaw (the royal capital where the king resides)". The pagoda is just  shorter than the Shwedagon Pagoda. Uppatasanti translates roughly to "Protection against Calamity". It is the name of a sūtra prepared by a monk in the early 16th century. It is to be recited in time of crisis, especially in the face of foreign invasion.

Administration

The Naypyidaw Union Territory is administered at both the State/Region level, and as a municipality at the local level under two different governing bodies. Naypyidaw is one of three cities in the country to have municipal governance, the others being Yangon and Mandalay.

Naypyidaw Council (NPTC) is the regional administrative body of the territory, and is under the direct supervision of the President of Myanmar. The council is appointed by the President, and must have no less than 5 and no more than 10 members and include both civilians and military personnel. The Chairperson becomes the ex-officio Mayor, and the Head of the General Administration Department (GAD) of the territory becomes the Secretary of the council. Matters under the jurisdiction of the Council include: general planning, coordination of internal security, nature conservation, emergency management, oversight of civil service organizations within the territory, and any other duties assigned to it by the constitution or law.

Naypyidaw Development Committee (NPTDC) is the local government body of the territory. The committee is appointed by the President, and must have at least 5 members, but no more than 9. The Chairperson of the Committee becomes the Mayor of Naypyidaw, the vice-chairman becomes the Vice-Mayor, and the Head of Office becomes the Joint Secretary of the committee. Because both laws make the chair of the Council and Committee the mayor, the same person holds both offices. Matters under the jurisdiction of the Committee include: urban planning, land-use planning, planning permission, traffic management, various public works (sewage treatment, water supply, sanitation, roads, bridges, drainage, etc.), and other local competencies. Unlike the NPTC which must request funding for its budget from the Union government, the committee is permitted to levy taxes to fund its work.

The current mayor is Dr. Maung Maung Naing, appointed as the Chair of Naypyidaw Council on 2 February 2021. Dr. Myo Aung of the National League for Democracy party served as Mayor from his appointment on 1 April 2016, until his arrest on 1 February 2021, during the 2021 Myanmar coup d'état.

Administrative divisions
Naypyidaw Union Territory consists of 2 districts subdivided into 8 townships. Pyinmana, Lewe, and Tatkone townships were all formerly part of Yamethin District in Mandalay Region. Ottarathiri, Dekkhinathiri, Popphathiri, Zabuthiri, and Zeyathiri are all new townships under construction. Like the townships in the rest of the country, they are governed by a development affairs organization (DAO) which includes a Township Administrator appointed by the General Administration Department, and an elected Township Development Affairs Committee (TDAC).

Ottara District
 Ottarathiri Township (from Pali )
 Pobbathiri Township (from Pali )
 Tatkone
 Zeyarthiri Township (from Pali )
Dekkhina District
 Dekkhinathiri Township (from Pali )
 Lewe Township
 Pyinmana Township
 Zabuthiri Township (from Pali )

There is sometimes some controversy about land use and changes in land ownership related to the urban spread of Naypyidaw. In late 2014, for example, there were suggestions in parliament that land grabs were occurring near the Dekkhinathiri Township and that existing laws needed to be amended to provide better protection for farmers.  There has also been criticism from some members of parliament about the size of the Naypyidaw Union Territory and the fact that money is being spent on urban infrastructure (such as lighting around lakes) although the facilities do not attract much use.

Transport

Roads 

There is a 20-lane boulevard; like most roads in the city, it is largely empty. Naypyidaw has four-lane roads and multilevel, flower-covered roundabouts (traffic circles).

Air 

It is served by all domestic airlines—Air Bagan, Air Mandalay, Myanmar National Airlines, FMI Air and Yangon Airways—with regular flights to Yangon and other cities across the country. Bangkok Airways, China Eastern Airlines, Qingdao Airlines, and Donghai Airlines serve the airport with international flights to and from Bangkok, Kunming, Nanning, Xi' an, and Shenzhen.

Buses and taxis
Public transport services are limited between neighborhoods. Government ministries run shuttle buses in the morning and evening to their respective buildings.

The city has a central bus station and one taxi company, which is operated by the military. Motorbikes are banned from some roads in Naypyidaw city limits, including sections of Taw Win Yadana Road, as a result of hundreds of traffic accident-related deaths in 2009.

Railways

Construction began on 8 December 2006 and Naypyidaw railway station was opened on 5 July 2009, even though the overpass, locomotive shed, concrete road leading up to the station, parking lot, passenger lounge and platform were not completed.

Before the opening of Naypyidaw railway station, Naypyidaw was served by Pyinmana and Lewe stations, though only Pyinmana station is on the main rail line (which extends from Yangon-Bago-Naypyidaw-Thazi-Mandalay). Lewe station is on the way from Pyinmana to Kyaukpadaung. It takes nine hours by train to get from Yangon to Pyinmana; trains leave at 12:00 and arrive at 21:30 local time.

In August 2011, Russian news media announced that a Russian-based firm would be constructing a  metro line, which would be the country's first underground rail system, underneath Naypyidaw. However, the Rail Transportation Ministry then announced that the plan had been cancelled due to lack of demand and budgetary limits.

Education and research

Higher education 
Yezin(a few kilometers north-east of Naypyidaw and Pyinmana)
Yezin University of Veterinary Science
Yezin Agricultural University
Yezin University of Forestry

Nay Pyi Taw
 University of Technology

Research 
 Forest Research Institute (FRI), Yezin
 Department of Agricultural Research (DAR), Yezin
 Southeast Asia Biodiversity Research Institute (SABRI)

Healthcare

The city is served by five public hospitals: 1000-bed Naypyidaw General Hospital, Naypyidaw Women Hospital, Naypyidaw ENT Hospital, 100-bed Naypyidaw Traditional Medicine Hospital, and Naypyidaw Orthopaedic Hospital. There is also a 300-bed Obstetric, Gynaecological and Children's Hospital of Defence Services, which is one of the teaching hospitals of Myanmar Defence Services Medical Academy. The nearby towns of Lewe, Pyinmana, and Tatkone each have one hospital.

Sports
Naypyidaw F.C, a Myanmar National League football club, is based at Wunna Theikdi Stadium in Naypyidaw.

Main sights

Pagodas 

 Uppatasanti Pagoda
 Maha Thetkya Yanthi Buddha
 Thatta Thattaha Maha Bawdi Pagoda (replica of Buddha Gaya)

Museums and memorials 

Memorial to the Fallen Heroes
 National Museum
 Defence Services Museum
 Naypyidaw Gems Museum
 Planetarium
 The Museum of Sport

Recreation 

Naypyidaw Safari Park
 National Herbal Park
Naypyidaw Zoological Gardens
 Naypyidaw Water Fountain Garden
National Landmark Garden
Naypyidaw Hot Spring Resort
 Wunna Theikdi Stadium
 Wunna Theikdi Indoor Stadium
 Zayarthiri Stadium

Concert halls and theatres 
 Myanmar International Convention Centre 1 (MICC-1)
 Myanmar International Convention Centre 2 (MICC-2)
 Open-Air Theatre

Arts and entertainment 
The Myanmar Motion Picture Academy Awards are held annually in Naypyidaw given to the highest achievers in Burmese cinema. There is a movie theater in the Junction Centre Mall as well as in the Ocean Shopping Mall. There are two others in nearby Pyinmana, and one in Tatkone Township.

Media and communications 
The headquarter of the Ministry of Information is located in Naypyidaw. Since 2009, Naypyidaw has had mobile phone coverage.

Print 
The Myanmar Alin and the Kyaymon in Burmese and the New Light of Myanmar in English are available in Naypyidaw. Since 18 November 2011, the Ministry of Information has begun publishing a weekly journal called the Naypyidaw Times, to report on government policies.

Radio 
There are a number of AM and FM stations broadcasting in Naypyidaw. The main available channels in Naypyidaw are Myanmar Radio (operated by MRTV), Cherry FM, Mandalay FM, FM Bagan, Padamyar FM, Pyinsawaddy FM, Shwe FM and City FM.

Television 
MRTV, MRTV-4 and MWD are the main channels, broadcasting Burmese-language programmes in Naypyidaw. Privately owned enterprise Sky Net provides more than 70 pay-TV channels of local and international origin. MRTV broadcasts 19 free-to-air channels and MWD broadcasts 8 free-to-air channels. Other TV channels such as Channel 7, 5-plus and Myanmar International, the English-language channel that targets overseas audiences are also available.

Costs and issues
One estimate puts the cost in the range of $3–4 billion USD although only part of this estimate is for cash spending because non-cash investments were also reportedly involved in supporting the construction effort.

There is now continual travel by vehicles along the  highway from Yangon to Naypyidaw, which is four lanes for most of the way. There are relatively few vehicles for much of the time on the road. Most trucks traveling north from Yangon to Naypyidaw and Mandalay are prohibited from using the highway. The Asian Development Bank has estimated that allowing more trucks onto the road would save over $100 million per year in reduced traveling time and other savings. There are plans to turn the road into a six-lane highway for greater safety.

The proportion of housing that meets expatriate needs is limited because the majority of existing apartments are for government employees.

In popular culture 
In March 2014, Naypyidaw was one of the locations featured on the British motoring TV show Top Gear during a two-part special event in Myanmar.

In 2018, Naypyidaw was on the TV show Dark Tourist.

See also

 List of capitals of Myanmar
 Naypyidaw Victoria rape case

Gallery

References

 Dulyapak Preecharushh, Naypyidaw: New Capital of Burma, 2009, White Lotus.

Notes

External links

Nay Pyi Daw – A photo album
Inside Napyidaw, The Flying Dutchman blog, 15 June 2007 (one of first two tourists to visit Naypyidaw, includes many photos)
Abode of Kings in a Derelict Kingdom, Disposable Words blog, 15 June 2007 (second of first two tourists to visit Naypyidaw, more photos)
BBC Top Gear Series 21 Episode 6

 
Populated places in Mandalay Region
Capitals in Asia
Planned capitals
Populated places established in 2005
Township capitals of Myanmar
2005 establishments in Myanmar
New towns started in the 2000s